Bonato is a surname. Notable people with the surname include:

Paola Bonato (born 1961), Italian footballer
Pietro Bonato (1765–1820), Italian painter
Yann Bonato (born 1972), French basketball player
Yoann Bonato (born 1983), French rally driver